Syntypistis perdix is a moth of the family Notodontidae first described by Frederic Moore in 1879. It is found in China, Taiwan, India, Nepal, Thailand and Vietnam.

Subspecies
Syntypistis perdix perdix (Yunnan, northern India, Nepal, Thailand, Vietnam)
Syntypistis perdix gutianshana (J. K. Yang, 1995) (Zheijang, Fujian, Hunan, Guangdong, Guangxi, Hainan, Taiwan)

References

Moths described in 1879
Notodontidae